Inside Job is a 1946 American crime film noir directed by Jean Yarbrough starring Preston Foster, Ann Rutherford, Alan Curtis and Milburn Stone.

Plot
An ex-convict, Eddie Norton (Alan Curtis), now reformed and working in a straight job at a department store, is found by his former partner, Bart Madden (Preston Foster), and blackmailed into helping him rob the department store payroll. Norton decides to pull off the job and take all of the money for himself and his wife, Claire (Ann Rutherford), who was previously unaware of his record.

One night after the store is closed, Norton cracks the safes and takes nearly a quarter of a million dollars. Madden learns quickly of the double cross but cannot find Norton who is in hiding with Claire. Norton finally arranges to be driven out of the city to start a new life but an informant tells Madden of his whereabouts. Madden arrives at Norton's boarding room just as the couple are about to leave. He knocks on Norton's door but a neighbor who is a police officer arrives at the critical moment with Christmas shopping for his family. Madden turns and shoots the police officer who returns fire wounding Madden who subsequently dies.

Norton is persuaded by his wife to try to save the police officer's life but it is at the cost of being found by the police and prosecuted.

Cast
 Preston Foster as Bart Madden
 Ann Rutherford as Claire Gray Norton
 Alan Curtis as Eddie Norton aka Eddie Mitchell
 Milburn Stone as District Attorney Sutton
 Samuel S. Hinds as Judge Kincaid
 Joe Sawyer as Police Capt. Thomas
 Marc Lawrence as Donovan
 John Berkes as Freddie
 Jimmy Moss as Skipper
 Howard Freeman as Mr. Winkle
 William Trenk as Cordet
 Oliver Blake as Herman
 Joan Shawlee as Ruth

Reception

Critical response
When the film was released, film critic Bosley Crowther panned the film in his review, "All this is played out in tedious fashion before justice is satisfied, and Inside Job thankfully gives way to the newsreels and a couple of short subjects, which, though not too good either, are infinitely better than the main attraction."

References

External links
 
 
 
 

1946 films
1940s crime thriller films
American crime thriller films
American black-and-white films
Film noir
Universal Pictures films
1940s English-language films
Films directed by Jean Yarbrough
Films with screenplays by Garrett Fort
Films set in department stores
1940s American films